A share may refer to
 Class A share, a class of company share 
 A-share (mainland China), all ordinary share that denominated in renminbi and traded on the stock exchanges of mainland China